Old Scott is an unincorporated community in Carter County, Oklahoma, United States. The elevation is 899 feet.

The community is north-northeast of Healdton, going north on Oklahoma State Highway 76, east on Oklahoma State Highway 53, then north on Samedan Road.

References

Unincorporated communities in Oklahoma